David Jackson (born 2 October 1949) is a Ugandan boxer. He competed at the 1968 Summer Olympics and the 1972 Summer Olympics.

References

External links
 

1949 births
Living people
Ugandan male boxers
Olympic boxers of Uganda
Boxers at the 1968 Summer Olympics
Boxers at the 1972 Summer Olympics
Sportspeople from Kampala
Light-middleweight boxers